Delfo Cabrera Gómez (April 2, 1919 – August 2, 1981) was an Argentine athlete, winner of the marathon race at the 1948 Summer Olympics in one of the most dramatic finishes in athletics history.

Biography
Born in Armstrong, Santa Fe Province, Delfo played football as a youth, but decided to turn to athletics after Juan Carlos Zabala's triumph at the 1932 Summer Olympics.

He moved to Buenos Aires in 1938 and began training in San Lorenzo de Almagro under Francisco Mura. In the same year, he won his first national championships title (in 5000 m). Over the years he would win 9 more titles, but none of them in marathon.

Delfo served in the army during the World War II where he met Juan Perón. After the war, being a friend of Perón, he was active member of the Justicialist Party.

The London Olympic Games was Cabrera's first major international competition. Etienne Gailly from Belgium dominated the marathon race most of the way and until almost the very last moments. He was the first to enter the stadium, but with 400 m to go, Gailly fell down, exhausted, got up and fell again. It was like Dorando Pietri's dramatic finish 40 years before. Cabrera and Tom Richards of Great Britain managed to pass the staggering Gailly, Delfo winning 16.0 seconds ahead of Richards.

For 64 years, the victory remained the last Argentinian gold medal in an individual competition, until the victory of Sebastián Crismanich in taekwondo in the 2012 games.

Cabrera also participated in the 1952 Summer Olympics and was the flag bearer for Argentina at the opening ceremony; he finished in sixth place in the marathon, which was won by Emil Zátopek. Cabrera ended his athletics career after finishing sixth at the 1954 Boston Marathon. After that he taught physical education in several schools.

Delfo died in a car accident near the town of Alberti, Buenos Aires province, when driving back to Buenos Aires from a reception in his honour at Lincoln.

Achievements

References

External links 
 
 

1919 births
1981 deaths
People from Belgrano Department, Santa Fe
Road incident deaths in Argentina
Argentine male marathon runners
Argentine male long-distance runners
Olympic athletes of Argentina
Olympic gold medalists for Argentina
Athletes (track and field) at the 1948 Summer Olympics
Athletes (track and field) at the 1951 Pan American Games
Athletes (track and field) at the 1952 Summer Olympics
Medalists at the 1948 Summer Olympics
Pan American Games gold medalists for Argentina
Olympic gold medalists in athletics (track and field)
Pan American Games medalists in athletics (track and field)
Medalists at the 1951 Pan American Games
Sportspeople from Santa Fe Province